Šešelj is a Serbo-Croatian surname, borne by Croats and Serbs, found in Croatia, Bosnia and Herzegovina, and Serbia. It may refer to:

 Vojislav Šešelj, Serbian politician
 Jadranka Šešelj, Serbian politician
 Zlatko Šešelj, Croatian politician, Member of Parliament 2000–2003

Anthropology

Popovo field
In Zavala, there were 3 households of Šešelj, an Orthodox family (1959). They arrived six generations prior to 1959.
In Orahov Do, an Orthodox family.

As summarized by Vojislav Šešelj (1992), at the end of the 18th century, there were three brothers in the village of Riđani – Petar, Nikola and Risto. The brothers killed a bey and his brothers, then fled to the Popovo field. They first lived in the village of Kotezi, then Nikola settled in Mareva Ljut near Zavala, Risto stayed in Kotezi, and Petar settled in Opuzen (now in Croatia). Nikola was the ancestor of the Popovo field Šešelj families. Petar was the ancestor of the Catholic Šešelj (also called Petković), who still have the slava of St. Luke. In Ljubo Mihić's work (1975), two houses of Šešelj in Mareva Ljut were registered, that had settled from Kotezi, and before that Veličani (in a place called Šešeljevina), ultimately hailing from Riđani from where Lazar moved, the fifth ancestor of Dušan Šešelj (born 1899).

References

Croatian surnames
Serbian surnames